Grand Central Madison is a commuter rail terminal for the Long Island Rail Road (LIRR) in the Midtown East neighborhood of Manhattan in New York City. Part of the East Side Access project, the new terminal started construction in 2008 and opened on January 25, 2023. The station sits beneath Grand Central Terminal, which serves the Metropolitan Transportation Authority (MTA)'s Metro-North Railroad.

Grand Central Madison was built to reduce travel times to and from Manhattan's East Side and to ease congestion at Penn Station, the West Side station where all Manhattan-bound LIRR trains had terminated since 1910. The new terminal enables passengers to transfer to Metro-North's Harlem, Hudson, and New Haven Lines, as well as the New York City Subway at Grand Central–42nd Street station.

Services 

The station serves the Long Island Rail Road's Main Line, which connects to all passenger branches and almost all stations. The initial service starting on January 25, 2023, was a shuttle, known as Grand Central Direct, to and from Jamaica station, with some trains running express and others making intermediate stops at Woodside, Forest Hills, and Kew Gardens. Full service at the station began on February 27, 2023, with trains continuing past Jamaica to most branches.

Passengers traveling to and from non-electrified portions of the LIRR system (e.g., the Oyster Bay Branch or the Port Jefferson Branch east of Huntington) will have to transfer trains because the bilevel C3 coaches used in non-electrified areas cannot fit through the 63rd Street Tunnel.

History 

Formal proposals to bring Long Island Rail Road trains to the east side of Manhattan date to 1963. In 1968, the 63rd Street Tunnel and a LIRR "Metropolitan Transportation Center" at 48th Street and Third Avenue were proposed as part of the Program for Action. After people living near the proposed transportation center objected, the MTA's board of directors voted to route LIRR trains to Grand Central by 1977. However, the LIRR project was postponed indefinitely during the 1975 New York City fiscal crisis.

The East Side Access project was restarted after a study in the 1990s showed that more than half of LIRR riders work closer to Grand Central than to Penn Station. The cost of the project, estimated at $4.4 billion in 2004, jumped to $6.4 billion in 2006 and to $11.1 billion by 2017. The new stations and tunnels began service in January 2023.

In May 2022, the MTA announced that the station would be named Grand Central Madison because it sits under Grand Central Terminal and the "Madison Avenue corridor". The LIRR received operational control of Grand Central Madison on December 9, 2022, upon which the station and tracks became subject to Federal Railroad Administration regulations. The Grand Central Madison station's opening was delayed because of a single ventilation fan that could not exhaust enough air. At the end of December 2022, the MTA postponed the station's opening to January 2023. On January 23, an official opening date of January 25 was announced, paired with the first revenue service that morning. The MTA then announced on February 8 that it would implement full service on February 27.

Station layout 

There are 22 elevators and 47 escalators in the station; the escalator count exceeds the number of escalators in the remainder of the LIRR system.

Concourse 
The retail and dining concourse, called the Madison Concourse, is accessed from street level or the Metro-North terminal via stairwells and elevators. It is located at the same level of the western part of Metro-North's Lower Level, underneath tracks 38 to 42 of Metro-North's Upper Level, and Vanderbilt Avenue. The concourse contains a ticket office, ticketed waiting area, nursing room, and customer service office under 47th Street. It also has restrooms, ticket machines, and retail spaces throughout the concourse.

The LIRR terminal has entrances from Grand Central Terminal's Dining Concourse and Biltmore Room. Additionally, the MTA built and opened new entrances to the LIRR station at 45th, 46th, and 48th streets. , the 45th Street entrance alone was projected to serve 10,000 passengers per day.

Mezzanine 
A mezzanine sits on a center level between the LIRR's two track levels. The longest escalator is the longest escalator in New York. The escalators and elevators are among the few which are privately operated in the entire MTA system.

Platforms and tracks 

The LIRR terminal contains four platforms and eight tracks (numbered 201–204 and 301–304) in two bi-level caverns. There are four tracks and two platforms in each of the two caverns, with each cavern containing two tracks on one island platform per level.

Exits 
The MTA originally planned to build and open entrances at 44th, 45th, 47th, and 48th Streets. The station connects to existing entrances at Grand Central North. The new LIRR station also contains entrances at 335 Madison Avenue, near the southeast corner with 44th Street; at 270 Park Avenue and 280 Park Avenue near 47th and 48th–49th Streets, respectively; and at 347 Madison Avenue, on the east side of the avenue at 45th Street. An entrance on 46th Street between Lexington and Park Avenue was also built, connecting with Grand Central North. However, the MTA later announced its intent to defer construction of an entrance at 48th Street because the owner of 415 Madison Avenue wanted to undertake a major construction project on the site. The MTA also connects the new station to the existing 47th Street cross-passage.

Art 

Like the art in the original Grand Central Terminal, the new station includes permanent site-specific works of art.

Among them are five large glass mosaics on natural themes by Kiki Smith. The Madison Concourse level contains River Light, a  abstract, largely blue-and-white depiction of sunshine on the East River. The other four, one level down in the LIRR mezzanine, are: The Presence, a landscape with a deer; The Sound, a seascape with a gull; The Spring, featuring four turkeys; and The Water's Way, a beach scene. "I wanted places for people to say, 'Meet you by the deer'", Smith told the New York Times.

The Madison Concourse level also holds an even larger  mosaic by Yayoi Kusama: "A Message of Love, Directly from My Heart unto the Universe".

See also 
 Transportation in New York City

References

External links 

 

2023 establishments in New York City
2020s in Manhattan
Grand Central Terminal
Long Island Rail Road stations in New York City
42nd Street (Manhattan)
Madison Avenue
Park Avenue
Railroad terminals in New York City
Railway stations in the United States opened in 2023
Railway stations in Manhattan
Railway stations located underground in New York (state)